Why Me? is a 2015 Romanian drama film directed by Tudor Giurgiu. It was screened in the Panorama section of the 65th Berlin International Film Festival. It is a fictional film inspired by the professional experience of Cristian Panait.

Cast
 Emilian Oprea as Cristian Panduru
 Mihai Constantin as Codrea
 Andreea Vasile as Dora
 Dan Condurache as Iustin Petrut
 Liviu Pintileasa as Ionut
 Mihai Smarandache as Serban
 Alin Florea as Bogdan Leca

References

External links
 

2015 films
2015 drama films
Romanian drama films
2010s Romanian-language films